Franz Weber (24 March 1888 – 10 August 1962) was a German actor who appeared in more than a hundred films during a lengthy screen career. He appeared in a diverse range of productions which encompassed the Weimar, Nazi and post-war (both East and West Germany) eras.

Selected filmography

 There Is a Woman Who Never Forgets You (1930)
 Panic in Chicago (1931)
 Berlin-Alexanderplatz (1931)
 Weekend in Paradise (1931)
 The Trunks of Mr. O.F. (1931)
 The Spanish Fly (1931)
 Spell of the Looking Glass (1932)
 Little Girl, Great Fortune (1933)
 Paganini (1934)
 The Two Seals (1934)
 Such a Rascal (1934)
 Gypsy Blood (1934)
 The Island (1934)
 The Brenken Case (1934)
 The Double (1934)
 Pillars of Society (1935)
 A Strange Guest (1936)
 Family Parade (1936)
 Capers (1937)
 Freight from Baltimore (1938)
 Triad (1938)
 Dance on the Volcano (1938)
 Yvette (1938)
 Target in the Clouds (1939)
 Wibbel the Tailor (1939)
 Renate in the Quartet (1939)
 Detours to Happiness (1939)
 Liberated Hands (1939)
 Her First Experience (1939)
 The Leghorn Hat (1939)
 Clothes Make the Man (1940)
 The Fox of Glenarvon (1940)
 The Gasman (1941)
 The Girl from Fano (1941)
 Love Me (1942)
 The Thing About Styx (1942)
 Diesel (1942)
 Between Heaven and Earth (1942)
 A Salzburg Comedy (1943)
 Melody of a Great City (1943)
 The Bath in the Barn (1943)
 The Wedding Hotel (1944)
 Summer Nights (1944)
 Young Hearts (1944)
 In Those Days (1947)
 The Marriage of Figaro (1949)
 The Beaver Coat (1949)
 The Great Mandarin (1949)
 A Rare Lover (1950)
 Before Sundown (1956)

References

Bibliography
 Giesen, Rolf. Nazi Propaganda Films: A History and Filmography. McFarland, 2003.

External links

1888 births
1962 deaths
German male film actors
German male stage actors